Marty Slimak has been the head coach of the baseball team at California Lutheran University since 1994 when he replaced Rich Hill. During his tenure, he has guided the university to twelve conference championships, thirteen regional appearances, four World Series appearances and as of 2017, one NCAA Division III national championship. He has set a record for the most victories in school history. He is the winningest coach in CLU history and received his 700th win during his 25th season in 2018. Slimak has seen thirteen of his players drafted to the Majors. His playing days date to the 1970s when he played for former USC skipper Mike Gillespie at College of the Canyons. He also played two years for Dave Gorrie at UC Santa Barbara, where he earned his bachelor's degree. He earned his master's degree at Cal Lutheran in 1996.

References

Living people
California Lutheran University faculty
College of the Canyons Cougars baseball players
Year of birth missing (living people)
Cal Lutheran Kingsmen baseball coaches
UC Santa Barbara Gauchos baseball players